Reynold McLean (born 9 April 1973) is a Vincentian cricketer. He played in ten first-class and nine List A matches for the Windward Islands from 1998 to 2003.

See also
 List of Windward Islands first-class cricketers

References

External links
 

1973 births
Living people
Saint Vincent and the Grenadines cricketers
Windward Islands cricketers